This article details the fixtures and results of the Bahrain national football team in 2013.

Schedule

Friendly matches

21st Arabian Gulf Cup

References

Bahrain national football team
2013 national football team results
2012–13 in Bahraini football
2013–14 in Bahraini football